Gunnar Andrésson (born 28 November 1970) is an Icelandic former handball player who competed in the 1992 Summer Olympics.

References

1970 births
Living people
Gunnar Andresson
Gunnar Andresson
Handball players at the 1992 Summer Olympics